Eileen McDonough (May 20, 1962 – March 13, 2012) was an American former child actress, best known for appearing on various television series including The Mary Tyler Moore Show, Gunsmoke, The Waltons, and Apple's Way.

She was born in Philadelphia, Pennsylvania, to parents Joe and Loretta McDonough.

She died on March 13, 2012, in Van Nuys, California, aged 49.

References

External links

1962 births
2012 deaths
Actresses from Philadelphia
American child actresses
American television actresses
21st-century American women